Willi Braun is a retired male badminton player from Germany.

Career
A doubles specialist noted for his ability to "cut off" the shuttle in the forecourt, Braun won the gold medal at the 1972 and 1974 European Badminton Championships in men's doubles with Roland Maywald. They also won a bronze medal in 1972 Munich Olympic Games when badminton was played as a demonstration sport and reached the semifinal of the All-England Championships on three occasions. He also won the U.S. Open men's doubles title in 1976 with Maywald. Braun won the German national men's doubles title five times, four times with Maywald and once with Franz Beinvogel.

References

External links 

German male badminton players
Living people
1944 births
Badminton players at the 1972 Summer Olympics